Elsa Dreisig (born 1991) is a French-Danish operatic soprano. Based at the Berlin State Opera, she made a European career in both opera and concert. Her opera roles include, besides the standard lyric soprano repertoire such as Mozart's Fiordiligi and Bizet's Micaëla, Baroque opera such as Rameau's Hippolyte et Aricie, and the world premiere of Beat Furrer's Violetter Schnee.

Life

Training 
Dreisig was born in Paris, the daughter of the Danish opera singer  and the French singer, conductor and director Gilles Ramade. She sang in the children's choirs of the Opéra Royal de Wallonie and the Opéra National de Lyon. She studied singing with Valérie Guillorit at the Conservatoire de Paris, and at the University of Music and Theatre Leipzig with Regina Werner-Dietrich.

Opera career 
From 2015 to 2017, Dreisig was a member of the opera studio of the Staatsoper Unter den Linden, leading to a permanent engagement by Daniel Barenboim. She appeared there as Gretel in Humperdinck's Hänsel und Gretel, as Pamina in Mozart's Die Zauberflöte, in the title role of Verdi's La traviata, as Euridice in Gluck's Orfeo ed Euridice and as Dircé in Cherubini's Médée. In the 2018/19 season, she performed as Diane in Rameau's Hippolyte et Aricie, conducted by Simon Rattle, and took part as Natascha in the world premiere of Beat Furrer's Violetter Schnee, directed by Claus Guth and conducted by Matthias Pintscher.

In 2015, she achieved first prize at the Neue Stimmen competition and placed second, behind Lise Davidsen, at the Queen Sonja International Music Competition. In 2016, she won first prize at the Operalia singing competition in Guadalajara, created by Plácido Domingo. and was voted "Newcomer of the Year" in the critics' choice of the Opernwelt magazine. She was also awarded the Victoires de la Musique Classique award in the category "vocal discovery".

Dreisig first appeared at the Aix-en-Provence Festival in 2017 as Micaëla in Bizet's Carmen, and first at the Paris Opera. In 2018, she performed as Musetta in Puccini's La Bohème at the Opernhaus Zürich, and as Lauretta in Gianni Schicchi at the Paris Opera. In 2019, she was Zerlina in Mozart's Don Giovanni and Elvira in Bellini's I puritani, again at the Paris Opera. In late 2019, she first appeared at the Royal Opera House in London as Pamina. In August 2020, she first performed on stage at the Salzburg Festival in as Fiordiligi in Mozart's Così fan tutte, staged by Christof Loy. Due to the COVID-19 pandemic, the performance took place without audience but was broadcast via livestreaming by Norddeutscher Rundfunk.

Concert singer 
In 2017, Dreisig undertook a European tour with the Berlin Philharmonic conducted by Simon Rattle, singing in Haydn's Die Schöpfung, including her first time at the Salzburg Festival. She appeared with the London Symphony Orchestra in Beethoven's Christus am Ölberg, as well as with the Staatskapelle Berlin, the Vienna Philharmonic, the Munich Philharmonic and the West-Eastern Divan Orchestra. She has worked with conductors such as Daniel Barenboim, Fabio Luisi, Franz Welser-Möst, Massimo Zanetti and David Zinman.

In 2020, the second album was released, Morgen, with pianist Jonathan Ware.

Awards and nominations 
 2015: Neue Stimmen – first prize.
 2015: Queen Sonja International Music Competition – second prize.
 2016: Operalia – first prize.
 2016: Opernwelt – Distinction as "Nachwuchskünstlerin des Jahres" (female newcomer of the year)
 2016: Victoires de la Musique Classique – Distinction as "sängerische Entdeckung" (singer discovered).
 2019: International Opera Awards 2019 – Nomination for Miroir(s) in the recital category.
 2020: Echo Klassik – Nomination in the Nachwuchskünstlerin Gesang (female vocal newcomer) category.

Recordings 
 2018: Miroir(s) : opera arias, Warner Music Group 
 2020: Morgen with Jonathan Ware, piano, Parlophone Records

References

External links 
 
 Elsa Dreissig, operabase.com
 Elsa Dreisig, warnerclassics.com
 
 

French operatic sopranos
1991 births
Living people
Singers from Paris